Pomphrey is a surname. Notable people with the surname include:

Bob Pomphrey (born 1944), English cricketer
Thomas Canfield Pomphrey (1881–1966), Scottish architect